The 1987 WCT Tournament of Champions, also known by its sponsored name Shearson Lehman Brothers Tournament of Champions,  was a men's tennis tournament played on outdoor clay courts in Forest Hills, Queens, New York City in the United States. The event was part of the 1987 Grand Prix circuit and was organized by World Championship Tennis (WCT). It was the 11th edition of the tournament and was held from May 4 through May 10, 1987. Fourth-seeded Andrés Gómez won the singles title.

Finals

Singles

 Andrés Gómez defeated  Yannick Noah 6–4, 7–6(7–5), 7–6(7–1)
 It was Gomez' 1st singles title of the year and the 15th of his career.

Doubles

 Guy Forget /  Yannick Noah defeated  Gary Donnelly /  Peter Fleming 4–6, 6–4, 6–1

References

External links
 International Tennis Federation – tournament edition details

1987 Grand Prix (tennis)
World Championship Tennis Tournament of Champions
WCT Tournament of Champions
1987 in sports in New York City